Benedictus is a given name. Notable people with the name include:

 Benedictus Appenzeller (c.1480–1558), Franco-Flemish singer and composer
 Benedictus Arias Montanus (1527–1598), Spanish orientalist
 Benedictus Buns (1642–1716), German/Dutch priest and composer
 Benedictus Marwood Kelly (1785–1867), British naval officer
 Benedictus Aretius (1505–1574), Swiss Protestant theologian and natural philosopher
 Benedictus van Haeften (1588–1648), Provost of Affligem Abbey and a writer of religious works

Benedictus is also the Latin form of the name Benedict borne by many figures including Pope Benedict XVI.